is a Japanese footballer currently playing as a midfielder for Renofa Yamaguchi.

Career statistics

Club
.

Notes

References

External links

1998 births
Living people
Toin University of Yokohama alumni
Japanese footballers
Association football midfielders
J2 League players
Toin University of Yokohama FC players
Renofa Yamaguchi FC players